Äynu may refer to:
 Äynu people
 Äynu language

See also 
 Aynu (disambiguation)